Herbert Smyth may refer to:

 Herbert Weir Smyth (1857–1937), American classical scholar
 Herbert Warington Smyth (1867–1943), British traveller, writer, naval officer and mining engineer